Dawson Community College (DCC) is a public community college in Glendive, Montana. The college enrolls approximately 400 students and offers associate degree programs and certificate programs. It is accredited by the Northwest Commission on Colleges and Universities and is part of the Montana University System.

Academics
Dawson offers the Associate of Arts (AA), Associate of Science (AS), and Associate of Applied Science (AAS) degree programs.  It also offers vocational certificate programs.  The college has an open admissions policy.

Campus housing
The student housing complex is made up of thirty-six, two bedroom apartments which house up to six students. Each fully furnished unit includes two bedrooms, a full kitchen, a dining area, a living room, and a full bathroom. The room and board cost includes a student's rent, utilities, cable television, local telephone, high speed internet access, and participation in the 10 meal or 16 meal per week food plan. Students living on campus have easy and quick access to all the campus buildings, offices, and activities.

Full-time students under the age of 21 must live on campus until they have earned 30 credits. All students living on campus must participate in the food plan. Students can reserve a space for housing at the same time an admissions application is submitted.

Athletics
The DCC Buccaneers varsity athletic programs provide intercollegiate competition.  Dawson Community College athletics compete in the National Junior College Athletic Association (NJCAA), the National Intercollegiate Rodeo Association (NIRA), and in the Mon-Dak conference.

Men's athletic programs:
Baseball
Basketball
Rodeo
Cross-country
Track and field

Women's athletic programs
Basketball
Fast-pitch softball
Rodeo
Volleyball
Cross-country
Track and field

Dawson Community College Athletics rivals are the Miles Community College (MCC) Pioneers.

Notable people

Faculty
Ralph Lenhart, mathematic professor, interim president, and legislator

Alumni
Jeff Delzer (R), North Dakota House of Representatives, 8th District

See also
Glendive, Montana
Dawson County, Montana

References

External links

Community colleges in Montana
Buildings and structures in Dawson County, Montana
Educational institutions established in 1940
Universities and colleges accredited by the Northwest Commission on Colleges and Universities
Education in Dawson County, Montana
1940 establishments in Montana
NJCAA athletics